Elections to Down District Council were held on 7 June 2001 on the same day as the other Northern Irish local government elections. The election used four district electoral areas to elect a total of 23 councillors.

Election results

Note: "Votes" are the first preference votes.

Districts summary

|- class="unsortable" align="centre"
!rowspan=2 align="left"|Ward
! % 
!Cllrs
! % 
!Cllrs
! %
!Cllrs
! %
!Cllrs
! % 
!Cllrs
!rowspan=2|TotalCllrs
|- class="unsortable" align="center"
!colspan=2 bgcolor="" | SDLP
!colspan=2 bgcolor="" | UUP
!colspan=2 bgcolor="" | Sinn Féin
!colspan=2 bgcolor="" | DUP
!colspan=2 bgcolor="white"| Others
|-
|align="left"|Ballynahinch
|bgcolor="#99FF66"|39.4
|bgcolor="#99FF66"|2
|24.0
|1
|13.6
|1
|23.0
|1
|0.0
|0
|5
|-
|align="left"|Downpatrick
|bgcolor="#99FF66"|52.7
|bgcolor="#99FF66"|4
|9.3
|1
|21.1
|1
|2.4
|0
|14.5
|1
|7
|-
|align="left"|Newcastle
|bgcolor="#99FF66"|44.6
|bgcolor="#99FF66"|3
|15.7
|1
|27.6
|2
|9.0
|0
|3.1
|0
|6
|-
|align="left"|Rowallane
|25.1
|1
|bgcolor="40BFF5"|41.8
|bgcolor="40BFF5"|3
|4.4
|0
|26.2
|1
|2.5
|0
|5
|- class="unsortable" class="sortbottom" style="background:#C9C9C9"
|align="left"| Total
|41.2
|10
|21.8
|6
|17.2
|4
|14.3
|2
|5.5
|1
|23
|-
|}

Districts results

Ballynahinch

1997: 3 x SDLP, 1 x UUP, 1 x DUP
2001: 2 x SDLP, 1 x UUP, 1 x DUP, 1 x Sinn Féin
1997-2001 Change: Sinn Féin gain from SDLP

Downpatrick

1997: 5 x SDLP, 1 x Sinn Féin, 1 x UUP
2001: 4 x SDLP, 1 x Sinn Féin, 1 x UUP, 1 x Independent
1997-2001 Change: Independent gain from SDLP

Newcastle

1997: 3 x SDLP, 1 x Sinn Féin, 1 x UUP, 1 x Women's Coalition
2001: 3 x SDLP, 2 x Sinn Féin, 1 x UUP
1997-2001 Change: Sinn Féin gain from Women's Coalition

Rowallane

1997: 3 x UUP, 1 x DUP, 1 x SDLP
2001: 3 x UUP, 1 x DUP, 1 x SDLP
1997-2001 Change: No change

References

Down District Council elections
Down